"Can You Handle My Love??" is a song by American rock band Walk the Moon. It was released on July 14, 2021, as the lead single from their fifth studio album, Heights (2021). This is their first single not to feature bassist Kevin Ray, who parted ways with the band in December 2020.

Composition
"Can You Handle My Love??" was written by Nicholas Petricca, Eli Maiman, Sean Waugaman, Tommy English and K.Flay. The track's production was handled by English along with record producer Mike Crossey.

Music video
The music video for "Can You Handle My Love??" was released alongside the single on Walk the Moon's YouTube channel at noon eastern time.

Live performances
"Can You Handle My Love??" was first performed live on Late Night with Seth Meyers.

Track listing

Credits and personnel
Credits adapted from Tidal.

Walk the Moon
 Nicholas Petricca – vocals, programming, songwriting, keyboard, bass
 Eli Maiman – guitar, backing vocals, songwriting
 Sean Waugaman – drums, percussion, backing vocals, songwriting 

Additional personnel
 K.Flay – additional vocals, songwriting
 Tommy English – producer, songwriting
 Mike Crossey – producer
 Carter Jahn – engineer
 Stephen Sesso – engineer
 Neal Avron – mixing engineer
 Scott Skrzynski – assistant engineer

Charts

Release history

References

2021 singles
2021 songs
RCA Records singles
Walk the Moon songs